Godmanchester is a town and civil parish in the Huntingdonshire district of Cambridgeshire, England. It is separated from Huntingdon,  to the north, by the valley of the River Great Ouse. Being on the Roman road network, the town has a long history. It has a waterside location, surrounded by open countryside of high value for its biodiversity but it remains highly accessible, with a railway line to London, the A1 road and M11/A14 which run nearby.

Etymology
The town was listed as Godmundcestre in the Domesday Book, and was subsequently known as Gutmuncetre, Gudmencestre, Gudmundcestria, Gum(m)uncestre, Gumencestre, Guncestre, Gumcestria, Gumecestre, Gommecestre, Gomecestria, Gummecestre, Gurmund(es)cestre, Gormecestre, Gormancestre, Gomecestre, Gunnecestre, Gurmecestre, Godmechestre, Gurminchestre, Gumchestre, Gurmencestre, Gumcestre, Gumestre, Godmonchestre, Gumecestur and Gumycestre.

The root itself is uncertain but the same as the town of Godalming, suggesting it may be derived from the ethnonym of the Goths who settled Sub-Roman Britain. The second element mund is the nominative plural of the Old English word munda, meaning "protector" or "guardian." The suffix chester derives from the Middle English cognate of the Latin word castrum, and was used by the Anglo-Saxons to denote the location of a former Roman (or sometimes pre-Roman) military fort.

The most likely translation is thus the nouns "Goths-guards-fort." Attributions to the Saxon King Guðrum c.835–890 are considered to be ahistorical founding myths reflective of the changes in Anglo-Saxon perceptions of the Goths over time.

A typical pronunciation was performed by the indie band The Howl and The Hum in their song, Godmanchester Chinese Bridge. A minority of visitors, former residents and residents continue to pronounce the place as Gumster, though this has long-since been superseded by Godmunchester, with stress on the first syllable.

History
The town is on the site of the Roman town of Durovigutum.  There is archaeological evidence of Celtic and earlier habitation prior to the establishment of a key Roman town and a mansio (inn), so the area has probably been continuously occupied for more than 2,000 years.

The remains of a neolithic temple circa 2900 BC, aligned to the Beltane sunrise, were documented between the town and the village of Hemingford Abbots. The location is likely to have been originally settled due to the gravel beds providing a ford across the River Great Ouse.

The settlement was at a crossroads of Roman roads Ermine Street, the Via Devana (from Cambridge, between Colchester and Chester) and a military road from Sandy, Bedfordshire. The Roman settlement was sacked by Anglo-Saxons in the third century. In contrast to Huntingdon, archaeological finds have been extensive in the centre of Godmanchester, which has two conservation areas of early recognition, including many timber-framed Tudor houses, the largest being Tudor Farm, dating from 1600 and restored in 1995.

The town's prosperity over the centuries has been closely tied to its strategic position on the old Roman Road from London to York. It is suggested that, in the Middle Ages, the Danes  allowed development of an inland port by digging the Mill Lade.

The place was listed as Godmundcestre in the Domesday Book of 1086 in the Hundred of Leightonstone in Huntingdonshire.

Godmanchester was first recognised with a town charter by King John in 1212, although it had been a market town and royal manor for some years. King James I  granted a second Royal Charter in 1604.

Farm Hall, on West Street, was used as a bugged detention centre for German nuclear scientists as part of Operation Epsilon, from July 1945 to January 1946.

Government

Godmanchester was a municipal borough based at Godmanchester Town Hall in the county of Huntingdonshire until 1961. It was then part of the borough of Huntingdon and Godmanchester until 1974. At county level, the town was in Huntingdonshire until 1965, when it became part of the new administrative county of Huntingdon and Peterborough. In 1974, the former, relatively diminutive, county of Huntingdon and Peterborough was absorbed into the administrative county of Cambridgeshire.

The highest tier of local government is Cambridgeshire County Council, locally represented by two county councillors serving Godmanchester and Huntingdon East (electoral division).

The second tier of local government, the planning authority and council-tax collecting body, is Huntingdonshire District Council, a non-metropolitan district, locally represented by two councillors elected for an eponymous ward.

The third and lowest tier of local government is Godmanchester town council. The council comprises 17 councillors, including a mayor and a deputy mayor.

At Westminster, Godmanchester is represented in the  Huntingdon seat in the House of Commons since 2001 by Jonathan Djanogly (Con).

Demography

Population
Since 1801, the population has been recorded every ten years by the UK census, the only exception being in 1941 due to the Second World War. In the 19th century, the population ranged from 1,573 (in 1801) to 2,438 (recorded in 1861). 
The fastest growth, an 81% increase in population, was between 1981 and 1991

Population figures since 1911 are:

All population census figures from report Historic Census figures Cambridgeshire to 2011 by Cambridgeshire Insight.https://www.citypopulation.de/en/uk/eastofengland/cambridgeshire/E34004422__godmanchester/

By 2016 Godmanchester had a population of about 6800 in 3,100 homes; it is expected that this will further increase to at least 4050 homes and 8600 residents by 2036.

Culture and community
The town has a waterside location surrounded by open countryside of high value for its biodiversity, agricultural land value, scenic beauty and landscape quality.

There are several bridges across the Great Ouse to Huntingdon. The Old Bridge, Huntingdon, a historic, medieval bridge, was the only road until 1975. In that year the original bypass route which is now used as a local road was built. Pedestrian traffic across the river is principally served by three additional footbridges.

England's largest meadow Portholme may be accessed from Godmanchester or Huntingdon, but lies within the Parish of Brampton. It remains an important flood plain, but has served as an equestrian racecourse and centre for early aviation.

To the North and East of the town are West and Eastside Common (SSSI), and Godmanchester Nature Reserve. These commons are intersected by The Ouse Valley Way and Pathfinder Way long-distance footpaths, and the route of a disused railway which connected the demolished Godmanchester Station and St Ives.

South of the town centre are the headquarters and a large operational shelter of veterinary/rescue charity Wood Green Animal Shelters.

A number of small businesses, plus DHL and Coop warehouses are situated on the southern edge of the town, on Chord Business park, Roman Way Industrial Estate and Cardinal Business Park.

Original historical documents relating to Godmanchester, including the original church parish registers, local government records, maps, photographs and the surviving borough charters, are held by Cambridgeshire Archives and Local Studies at the County Record Office, Huntingdon.

In October 2003, BBC1's Songs Of Praise was once again (previous transmission 1976) hosted by the parish church of St Mary the Virgin and featured the new hymn tune Godmanchester, written by the then vicar, Peter Moger.

Landmarks

Chinese Bridge

One of the town's largest public works of art and of landscaping is its Chinese Bridge, which connects to a water meadow. Local legend has it that the bridge was built without the use of nails or other fixings. The bridge was removed by crane on 9 February 2010. A new replica was built off-site in two parts and was installed on 15–16 February 2010. Today the Chinese Bridge does feature nails. The claims are believed to be false; a bridge in Queens' College, Cambridge, had the same urban myth. Expert commentators write that the original nails had corroded away, masking their presence.

Twin towns – sister cities
Godmanchester is twinned with:
 Wertheim am Main, Germany
 Salon-de-Provence, France
 Szentendre, Hungary
 Gubbio, Italy
Facilitated by Huntingdon and Godmanchester Twinning Association

Sport and leisure
The non-League football club Godmanchester Rovers F.C. play at Bearscroft Lane, whose teams play in various regional divisions.

Transport
The arterial road connects the West Midlands to the Haven ports of Ipswich, Harwich and Felixstowe and via the M11 to London. Since opening in 2020 the A1307  provides a resilient route for light vehicles, north across the river into Huntingdon, or south to St. Ives and Cambridge . (Historically this route has been repeatedly renamed: most recent first, A1307, A14, A604, Via Devana). 
The A1198 road, Ermine Street links traffic to the A14 or to Royston, and is used for shorter journeys south avoiding the A1.

The town of Huntingdon and railway station may also be accessed on foot via the expansive meadow or by National Cycle Network route 51.

Local buses from Godmanchester are provided by Whippet (bus company) on routes 66 (to Huntingdon and St Neots) and X2/X3 (to Huntingdon or Papworth and Cambridge).

Notable people
Stephen Marshall ( 1594 – 1655), prominent non-conformist churchman, before and during the Interregnum, 
Sir Oliver Cromwell (1562-1655), Uncle to the Lord Protector and ruler of England, Oliver Cromwell,
Sir William Prescott 1st Baronet of Godmanchester, (1874–1945), Civil Engineer and Member of Parliament. Father of Sir Richard Stanley Prescott. On the death of his uncle, Sir Mark Prescott, a race horse trainer from Newmarket became 3rd Baronet ,
Fred Beart (1850–1895), cricketer, was born in Godmanchester,
Nigel Bonner (1928-1994), Antarctic marine mammal specialist, retired to Godmanchester and died there,
Timothy Machin (born 1948), cricketer, was born in Godmanchester,
Simon Thurley (born 1962), historian and presenter, grew up in Godmanchester,
Darren Bent (born 1984), England international and Premier League footballer played for Godmanchester Rovers F.C. as a youth.

Notes

References

Sources

External links
Godmanchester Town Council
Godmanchester Porch Museum
Godmanchester Community Association Web site featuring photo records in the 'scrapbook'
The Roman Mansio in Godmanchester

 
Towns in Cambridgeshire
Populated places on the River Great Ouse
Huntingdonshire
Civil parishes in Cambridgeshire